Wayne Johnson may refer to:
Wayne Johnson (musician) (born 1949), American jazz and acoustic guitarist
Wayne Johnson (New Mexico politician), American politician in New Mexico
Wayne Johnson (Wyoming politician) (1942–2020), American politician in Wyoming
Wayne Johnson (athlete) (1902–1982), American long-distance runner